Haralson is a town in Coweta and Meriwether counties in the U.S. state of Georgia. The population was 172 at the 2020 census. It is noted for being one of the filming locations for both The Walking Dead and Lawless.

History
The first permanent settlement at Haralson was made in the 1820s. Haralson was named for Hugh A. Haralson, a former Georgia congressman, who is also the namesake of Haralson County, Georgia.

The Georgia General Assembly incorporated the place as the Town of Haralson in 1907.

Geography
The city limits extend slightly south into Meriwether County. Georgia State Routes 74 and 85 run concurrently through the town, leading north  to Senoia and south  to Gay.

Demographics

As of the census of 2000, there were 144 people, 57 households, and 200 families residing in the town. The racial makeup of the town was 84.03% White, 6.94% African American, 1.39% Asian, and 7.64% from two or more races.

There were 57 households, out of which 26.3% had children under the age of 18 living with them, 61.4% were married couples living together, 8.8% had a female householder with no husband present, and 24.6% were non-families. 21.1% of all households were made up of individuals, and 5.3% had someone living alone who was 65 years of age or older. The average household size was 2.53 and the average family size was 2.91.

In the town, the population was spread out, with 23.6% under the age of 18, 9.0% from 18 to 24, 31.9% from 25 to 44, 24.3% from 45 to 64, and 11.1% who were 65 years of age or older. The median age was 37 years. For every 100 females, there were 100.0 males. For every 100 females age 18 and over, there were 103.7 males.

The median income for a household in the town was $37,500, and the median income for a family was $39,167. Males had a median income of $33,750 versus $23,125 for females. The per capita income for the town was $16,346. There were 9.5% of families and 13.8% of the population living below the poverty line, including 25.8% of under eighteens and 33.3% of those over 64.

References

Towns in Coweta County, Georgia
Towns in Meriwether County, Georgia
Towns in Georgia (U.S. state)